Roy Bohler was a college athletics coach and athletic director. He also had a standout college basketball career as a player, earning All-American status in 1916. While playing for Washington State, Bohler – a 5'11" center – led the Cougars to an NCAA national championship in 1916–17 while playing under head coach Fred Bohler, his older brother.

Bohler coached college football, basketball, and baseball. His football stints include being the head coach at Willamette, Beloit, and Chico State. While at Beloit he also served as the school's athletic director. He resigned in March 1929 because he disagreed with providing student-athletes with scholarship money, an opinion that began gaining support among Beloit's officials during his time as athletic director. In basketball, Bohler coached at Beloit as well as for Humboldt State. His longest tenure for any team, however, was as the head baseball coach for Chico State, a position he held for 17 seasons. Chico State has since named their baseball field "Roy Bohler Field". In his 17 years as Chico State's coach, he led them to seven conference championships.

Head coaching record

Football

References

All-American college men's basketball players
American men's basketball coaches
American men's basketball players
Beloit Buccaneers athletic directors
Beloit Buccaneers football coaches
Beloit Buccaneers men's basketball coaches
Centers (basketball)
Chico State Wildcats baseball coaches
Chico State Wildcats football coaches
Humboldt State Lumberjacks men's basketball coaches
UC Santa Barbara Gauchos football coaches
Washington State Cougars baseball players
Washington State Cougars football players
Washington State Cougars men's basketball players
Willamette Bearcats football coaches